People’s Artiste of Azerbaijan (Azerbaijani: Xalq artisti) is the honorary title granted for contribution to the development of Azerbaijani culture.

Assignment 
The honorary title "People's Artiste of Azerbaijan" was established by Decree of the President of the Republic of Azerbaijan dated May 22, 1998, along with some other titles.

The President of Azerbaijan confers the honorary title on his initiative, as well as on the proposal of the National Assembly and the Cabinet of Ministers.

The title is awarded only to citizens of Azerbaijan. According to the decree, the honorary title of "People's Artiste of Azerbaijan" cannot be awarded to the same person repeatedly.

A person awarded an honorary title may be deprived of the title in cases of misconduct.

Persons awarded the honorary title "People's Artiste of Azerbaijan" also receive a certificate and a badge of the honorary title of the Republic of Azerbaijan. The badge of honor is worn on the right side of the chest.

People's Artistes of Azerbaijan 

 Nazakat Teymurova
 Yalchin Rzazade
 Gulaga Mammadov
 Mirnadir Zeynalov
 Polad Bulbuloglu
 Emin Agalarov

See also 
People’s Writer of Azerbaijan

Orders, decorations and medals of Azerbaijan

References 

Honorary titles of Azerbaijan